A parachute candidate, or carpetbagger in the United States, is a pejorative term for an election candidate who does not live in, and has little connection to, the area they are running to represent. The allegation is thus that the candidate is being “parachuted in” for the job by a desperate political party that has no reliable talent local to the district or state, or that the party (or the candidate themselves) wishes to give a candidate an easier election than would happen in their home area.

Australia

Australian Labor Party
Due to its factions, Labor often has arrangements in place for preselections, which would often result in parachuting candidates. Examples of such include Former Premier of New South Wales Kristina Keneally and Midnight Oil member Peter Garrett.

In 2004, musician and activist Peter Garrett was preselected as the Australian Labor Party candidate for the safe seat of Kingsford Smith due to the intervention of leader Mark Latham, despite opposition from the local ALP branch, who labelled him an outsider. The CFMEU issued a statement criticising his selection as "a pathetic version of political celebrity squares".
In 2007, journalist Maxine McKew was preselected as Labor candidate for Bennelong, held by then-Prime Minister John Howard. McKew did not live in the electorate at the time, and sold her home in Mosman to move prior to the election. She went on to defeat Howard, becoming the first candidate to unseat a sitting Prime Minister in an election since 1929.
In 2013, athlete Nova Peris was preselected as Labor's leading candidate for the Senate in the Northern Territory. Peris was born and raised in the Northern Territory, but her selection was received with controversy due to her celebrity status and the personal intervention of leader and Prime Minister Julia Gillard, who described the selection as a "captain's pick".
Jane Garrett, a former minister in the First Andrews Ministry in Victoria was parachuted into the number one position in the Eastern Victoria Region at the 2018 Victorian state election, a seat vacated by future MP Daniel Mulino for the Division of Fraser in Melbourne's western suburbs. Garrett had been the MP for the Electoral district of Brunswick which was becoming increasingly marginal and was criticised for her role in a dispute between the Country Fire Authority, the United Firefighters Union and the state government in her capacity as Minister for Emergency Services.
Daniel Mulino is the current MP for the Division of Fraser in Melbourne's western suburbs. Mulino had previously been a Member of the Victorian Legislative Council for the Eastern Victoria Region, a seat he vacated for Jane Garrett. Prior to his tenure in the Parliament of Victoria, Mulino was a councillor and mayor for the City of Casey. Mulino did not live in the electorate of Fraser up until the 2019 Australian federal election where he was elected. 
Former Premier of New South Wales Kristina Keneally was preselected as Labor candidate for 2017 Bennelong by-election. She lived 800 metres outside the electorate which, combined with her high profile, attracted accusations of parachuting.
Keneally sought preselection for the House of Representatives again in 2021, this time for the electorate of Fowler in western Sydney despite living in the affluent northern suburbs. She was also criticised for making the move despite retiring member Chris Hayes having already endorsed local Vietnamese Australian lawyer Tu Le as his successor in a working-class migrant neighbourhood. With heavy publicity drawn toward what is normally one of the safest seats in Australian politics, Keneally suffered a massive swing against the previous result and lost the seat for Labor for the only time in its 13-election existence, with parts of the area being held as far back as 1934 when part of Werriwa. This resulted in a former Liberal Party member who turned independent, Vietnamese Australian and former refugee Dai Le being elected.
Andrew Charlton, a former adviser to Prime Minister Kevin Rudd, was criticised for being parachuted into the Division of Parramatta to succeed retiring MP Julie Owens at the 2022 Australian federal election over local candidates who were from culturally and linguistically diverse backgrounds. Prior to the electoral campaign, Charlton resided in Sydney's eastern suburbs in Bellevue Hills in a property worth over $A16 million and only purchased a property in the electorate once preselected.
Mat Hilakari, Labor's candidate for the newly established electorate of Point Cook was parachuted in for the 2022 Victorian state election. Hilakari before pre-selection was residing in Melbourne's southeastern suburbs in Seaford. He is also the convenor for Labor's Socialist Left faction (of which Premier Daniel Andrews is a part) in Victoria.

Coalition
In 2013, Liberal National Senator Barnaby Joyce was preselected as Nationals candidate for the seat of New England. Joyce was raised in Tamworth, within the electorate, but had lived in Queensland for over twenty years, and represented the state in the Senate since 2005.
Georgina Downer was Liberal candidate for the electorate of Mayo in the 2018 by-election. Daughter of long-serving MP for Mayo Alexander Downer, Downer had grown up in the area and proclaimed that she was "coming home" in the by-election. However, she had lived most of her life in Adelaide and Melbourne, and sought preselection for a seat in the latter during the 2016 election. She lost to incumbent Rebekha Sharkie.

After the resignation of Prime Minister Malcolm Turnbull from parliament in 2018, Dave Sharma was preselected as the Liberal candidate in the resulting by-election. Sharma did not live in the electorate at the time. He narrowly lost the by-election, but successfully contested the seat again several months later in the 2019 federal election. He was defeated in the 2022 election by Independent candidate Allegra Spender.
Former President of the Australian Labor Party Warren Mundine was a parachute candidate for the Liberal Party of Australia in the Division of Gilmore at the 2019 Australian federal election to succeed retiring MP Ann Sudmalis. Prior to Mundine's selection, the local party branches had preselected Grant Schultz, whose candidacy would eventually be overridden by the party's state executive to select Mundine instead at the request of prime minister Scott Morrison. Mundine would be defeated by Fiona Phillips of the Australian Labor Party who received a two-party swing of 3.34 per cent while Schultz contested the electorate as an independent candidate, receiving 7,585 votes.

Canada
In 2008, the New Democratic Party nominated Phyllis Artiss, who lived in St. John's, for the northern riding of Labrador. Artiss was nominated in the absence of any local candidate, and admitted that her candidacy was not ideal: "It would be much better to have someone from Labrador who has lived there all their lives or much of their lives and worked there, and I haven't done that." Artiss was not successful in her bid.
Patrick Brown, who had previously been MP for Barrie and MPP for Simcoe North, was criticized as a parachute candidate when he announced his campaign for Mayor of Brampton in 2018. Brown ultimately was successful in his mayoral bid.
Chrystia Freeland faced allegations of being parachuted in by the Liberal Party to contest a 2013 by-election in safe seat Toronto Centre, given she was living in New York City at the time. She ultimately won the seat.
Kellie Leitch was accused of being a parachute candidate when she sought the Conservative nomination in the riding of Simcoe-Grey in Ontario. Leitch was born in Winnipeg, Manitoba and worked in Toronto at the time of her nomination. Leitch won the seat.
In 2021, the Conservative Party put forward Lea Mollison for the riding of Northwest Territories. Mollison was a resident of Thunder Bay, Ontario, and reportedly never visited the NWT. Mollison's campaign ignored local media requests, including an invitation to a candidates' forum, which drew widespread criticism. 
Lester B. Pearson, born and raised in Toronto, represented the riding of Algoma East, in rural Northwestern Ontario. In his memoirs, Pearson admitted he did not have "any earlier connection" to the riding; Pearson had been seeking entry into the House of Commons and the seat had been made vacant for him by appointing its sitting member to the Senate. Pearson was nevertheless won election eight times before retiring from parliament.

Ireland
Avril Doyle stood for Fine Gael at the 2004 European elections in the Ireland East constituency, despite being from Dublin, and was considered a parachute candidate.
George Lee was a successful parachute candidate for Fine Gael at the 2009 Dublin South by-election.
Journalist Susan O'Keeffe was described as a parachute candidate by local candidate Veronica Cawley when she stood for Labour in Sligo–North Leitrim at the 2011 general election; O'Keeffe is a native of Dublin but lived in Sligo at the time.
Lorraine Mulligan was described as a parachute candidate when she stood for Labour at the 2014 Dublin West by-election, despite living in Dublin Central.
Catherine Noone stood for Fine Gael in Dublin West at the 2016 general election; she later attempted to be "parachuted" in Dublin South-West before standing in Dublin Bay North at the 2020 general election.
Sheila Nunan stood for the Labour at the 2019 European elections in the Ireland South constituency, despite living in Dublin. Her team replied that she lived near the border with County Wicklow and her parents are from County Kerry, both counties located in the South constituency. Michael McNamara claimed that "a parachute candidate could look like desperation. We [the Labour Party] need to be relevant and have ideas that are relevant to people in rural Ireland."

Taiwan
Han Kuo-yu was a successful parachute candidate for Mayor of Kaohsiung at 2018 Taiwanese local elections. He has served previously on the Taipei County Council and as a member of Legislative Yuan elected by Taipei County.

United Kingdom
Parachute candidates are common in the Parliament of the United Kingdom. The Westminster system historically emphasizes party discipline over responsiveness to constituencies. Margaret Thatcher represented Finchley despite living in Chelsea, London.

A 2013 YouGov survey found that support for a hypothetical candidate rose by 12 points after voters learned that his opponent had moved to the area two years earlier, and by 30 points if the opponent lived 120 miles away. The percentage of local MPs rose, according to Michael Rush of the University of Exeter, from 25% in 1979 to 45% in 1997; Ralph Scott of Demos calculates that  63% are local.

According to surveys public trust in all MPs has decreased but trust in the local MP has increased, making pre-existing connections to seats more important. Election advertisements mention the candidate's party or party leader less often, and emphasize local connections. Such a change produces MPs that are more attentive to local issues, but may be detrimental to Britain's first-past-the-post system designed to create broad parties that party whips stabilize.

Roy Jenkins was so unfamiliar with Glasgow, he later wrote, that on arrival to campaign for the 1982 Glasgow Hillhead by-election its skyline was "as mysterious to me as the minarets of Constantinople" to Russian troops during the Russo-Turkish War. Jenkins won the election, taking the seat from the Scottish Conservatives.
Shaun Woodward defected from the Conservative Party to the Labour Party in 1999. He faced much criticism from former Conservative colleagues, particularly when he refused to resign and fight a by-election. Woodward did not run for re-election in his safe Conservative seat of Witney in Oxfordshire, instead being selected for the ultra-safe Labour seat of St Helens South in Merseyside. Labour Minister Chris Mullin wrote later in his diaries that "the New Labour elite parachuting [Woodward] into a safe seat ... [was] one of New Labour's vilest stitch-ups ... [it] made my flesh creep."
Luciana Berger was an example of Labour parachuting a middle-class southerner into one of its traditional heartland seats, in her case the northern working-class safe seat of Liverpool Wavertree. She was heavily criticised for having no connection to the Wavertree constituency or Liverpool when she first ran in 2010. When asked by a local radio station to answer basic questions about Liverpool she was unable to, and during the candidate selection process stayed at local MP Jane Kennedy's house rather than make any permanent home in the area. The media raised suggestions that she was only selected for the seat because of her close connections to the Blair family. She went on to win the seat in 2010 and retain it in 2015 and 2017. After joining the Liberal Democrats in 2019, she unsuccessfully contested the Greater London seat of Finchley and Golders Green in the 2019 general election. She made the decision to stand there because of the seat's high Jewish population and Remain vote, as well as her affinity towards living in London and choice to raise her children there, rather than in Liverpool.
David and Ed Miliband were selected to fight safe Labour seats in northern England, South Shields and Doncaster North respectively, despite being Oxford graduates who were born, raised, and living in London whilst working as political advisers. Both would later serve as cabinet ministers and fight against each other in the 2010 party leadership election.
Douglas Carswell defected from the Conservatives to the UK Independence Party in 2014, in turn displacing the existing UKIP candidate in his constituency of Clacton. Given Carswell was living in London at the time, he was accused carpetbagging by the former UKIP candidate.
George Galloway was expelled from Labour in 2003 and, despite previously representing Glasgow Kelvin, did not contest a Glasgow seat in 2005. Instead, he stood for the Respect Party in the Greater London constituency of Bethnal Green and Bow, where he used his opposition to the Iraq War and the local Muslim population to gain the seat from Labour. Tottenham MP and Constitutional Affairs Minister David Lammy said he was a carpetbagger who had whipped up racial tensions. After standing down from Bethnal Green and Bow in 2010, he had a two-year hiatus from parliament. In a 2012 by-election, he stood for Respect in the West Yorkshire seat of Bradford West, also with a high local Muslim population, where he made a point of not drinking and again gained the seat from Labour. He lost Bradford West in 2015 to Labour's Naz Shah, after a divisive campaign. Since then, he has made further attempts to parachute himself into constituencies in order to return to parliament. As an independent, he unsuccessfully contested Manchester Gorton in 2017 and West Bromwich East in 2019. He also attempted to be selected as the Brexit Party candidate in the Cambridgeshire seat of Peterborough in a 2019 by-election, but the party selected local businessman Mike Greene.

United States

U.S. Senate

Scott Brown was the unsuccessful Republican nominee in the 2014 United States Senate election in New Hampshire, despite having represented Massachusetts in the Senate just two years prior. Brown's family had previously resided in New Hampshire, however, and he owned a vacation home in the state.
Alan Keyes, a resident of Maryland, was the unsuccessful Republican nominee in the 2004 Illinois United States Senate election. Notably, he had previously made two unsuccessful runs for the Senate in Maryland.
Then-First Lady of the United States Hillary Clinton was elected in the 2000 United States Senate election in New York after having bought a house in Chappaqua, New York, in 1999, having previously resided in Arkansas.
Former United States Attorney General Robert F. Kennedy was elected to the U.S. Senate in New York in 1964, serving from 1965 until his death on June 6, 1968. He had previously resided in his home state of Massachusetts, although as a child he had also lived in the New York City neighborhood of Riverdale as well as Bronxville, a suburb north of New York City. During the campaign, Kennedy gave a speech in response to criticisms from his opponents over his alleged lack of ties to the state.
Mitt Romney was elected in the 2018 United States Senate election in Utah, despite having resided in Massachusetts during the 2012 United States presidential election and having served as the governor of Massachusetts from 2003 to 2007.
Mehmet Oz moved from Cliffside Park, New Jersey to Bryn Athyn, Pennsylvania several months prior to the primary of the 2022 United States Senate election in Pennsylvania.

U.S. House of Representatives

 Alex Mooney, a former member of the Maryland Senate and former chairman of the Maryland Republican Party, moved to West Virginia in 2013 after previously exploring a run for Maryland's 6th congressional district. Less than two years after moving, he was elected in the 2014 general election to represent West Virginia's 2nd congressional district.
 Trey Hollingsworth moved from Tennessee to Indiana in September 2015. He ran as a Republican to represent Indiana's 9th congressional district in the U.S. House of Representatives, and won the election in 2016.
 Morgan Ortagus, a former spokeswoman of State Department, moved from Florida to Tennessee only months prior to announcing her candidacy for 2022 Republican primary in Tennessee's 5th congressional district. Ortagus was ultimately disqualified due the Tennessee Republican Party's bylaws requiring candidates to have voted in three of the last four Tennessee Republican primaries.

New Zealand 
In 2017 Deborah Russell won selection for the safe Labour seat of New Lynn, in south-east Auckland despite being from Whangamōmona, a small town in the Manawatū-Whanganui region. She beat out Greg Presland a New Lynn resident for 30 years who had the backing of the local members but lost to Russell who was backed by Labour's Council because of her finance expertise and a pledge to have more women in electorates. Upon winning selection Russell moved to the electorate.

See also
List of democracy and elections-related topics

References 

Elections
Political metaphors referring to people
Elections terminology